Eva Rebecca Pope (born 16 November 1967) is an English actress, best known for her portrayal of longest-serving headmistress Rachel Mason in Waterloo Road, and appearances in Coronation Street, Dream Team, Baby Boys and Hetty Feather.

Early life and education
Eva Pope was born in Appley Bridge, Wigan, Lancashire on 16 November 1967. She trained to be an actress at the Webber Douglas Academy of Dramatic Art, graduating in 1988.

Career 
Pope's first major role was playing the villainous Tanya Pooley in the ITV soap opera Coronation Street from 1993 to 1994. Since then, she has made appearances in Cold Feet, The Bill, Heartbeat, Peak Practice (as Claire Brightwell), Men of the World, Holby City, Casualty, Strictly Confidential, Adventure Inc., Vincent (as Cathy Gallagher), Bad Girls as prison governess Frances Myers, Life on Mars, Sorted, Spooks: Code 9 and the film Shadow Man. From November 2007 to July 2010, she appeared as headteacher Rachel Mason in the BBC One school-based drama series Waterloo Road.

Pope's theatre credits include roles in The Comedy of Errors, Turkey Time and Hobson's Choice. She is a regular performer and was part of the original cast of Seven Deadly Sins Four Deadly Sinners and in November 2007, appeared at the Théâtre Princesse Grace, Monte Carlo, directed by Marc Sinden, as part of his British Theatre Season, Monaco.

In March 2011, Pope starred as Ellie in the BBC One daytime drama 32 Brinkburn Street. She starred in Being Sold the Movie, which premiered on 19 June 2011. On 13 August 2011, Eva Pope starred as policewoman Simone Grayson on Casualty in the first episode of series 26. She appeared in the third series of Moving On on 16 November 2011 playing Michelle. In 2017, she appeared in Season 20 Episodes 5 and 6 of the BBC forensic drama series Silent Witness as DI Heather Ashton. She played Matron "Gertie" Bottomly in CBBC's adaptation of Hetty Feather, based on the book of the same name by Jacqueline Wilson, for five years.

In 2019, Pope appeared in Deep Cuts as Bridget McFadden.

Pope is also a noted voice-over artist whose credits include Raymond Blanc's Kitchen Secrets and a number of audiobooks.

Personal life 
In 1994, Pope was married to graphic designer Laurence Lassalle, with whom she has a daughter. They divorced in 2004. Pope is a grandmother. She is a vegan.

Filmography

Film

Television

References

External links 
 
 Profile at Corrie.net

1967 births
Living people
Alumni of the Webber Douglas Academy of Dramatic Art
English stage actresses
English television actresses
English soap opera actresses
People from Appley Bridge
Actresses from Lancashire
20th-century English actresses
21st-century English actresses